Hing Cheung So from the City University of Hong Kong was named Fellow of the Institute of Electrical and Electronics Engineers (IEEE) in 2015 for contributions to spectral analysis and source localization.

References

Fellow Members of the IEEE
Living people
Academic staff of the City University of Hong Kong
Hong Kong engineers
Year of birth missing (living people)
Place of birth missing (living people)